Innocence is the ninth studio album by Murray Head. It was released in 1993.

Track listing
"Nothing To Lose"
"Move Closer"
"Comme des enfants qui jouent"
"All Eyes Are on the West"
"Le temps passe"
"When You're In Love"
"Ocean"
"Innocence"
"Little Bit of Loving"
"Un homme, une femme"
"Make It Easy"

External links
Innocence at the official Murray Head site.

Murray Head albums
1993 albums